Rural Grove is a hamlet in the Town of Root in Montgomery County, New York, United States. It is located on New York State Route 162 (NY 162).

References

Geography of Montgomery County, New York
Hamlets in Montgomery County, New York